The Oahu Bowl was a National Collegiate Athletic Association Football Bowl Subdivision (then known as Division I-A) bowl game played in Honolulu, Hawaii at Aloha Stadium. Played on Christmas Day or Christmas Eve, the Oahu Bowl was sponsored by the Jeep Division of Chrysler Corporation. The inaugural game was played in 1998 and the last game was played in 2000, after it lost its sponsorship as a result of a corporate merger between Jeep parent Chrysler Corporation and Daimler Benz. The Oahu Bowl was part of a double-header played after the Aloha Bowl on Christmas its first two years; the 2000 game was played on Christmas Eve.

In 2001, the Oahu Bowl became the Seattle Bowl and played two games before losing NCAA certification. The Aloha Bowl, scheduled to move to San Francisco at the same time, lost certification before it could play a game.

Game results
Rankings are based on the AP Poll prior to the game being played.

Appearances by team

Appearances by conference

In popular culture
 In the "Twas the Nut Before Christmas" episode of King of the Hill (first aired December 17, 2000), Hank Hill exclaims "Tomorrow, Christmas service falls right between the Aloha Bowl and the Oahu Bowl. "

See also
 Poi Bowl (1936–1939)
 Pineapple Bowl (1940–1952)
 Aloha Bowl (1982–2000)
 Hawaii Bowl (since 2002)
 Hula Bowl (1947–2008)
 List of college bowl games

References

 
American football in Hawaii
College sports in Hawaii
Defunct college football bowls
Recurring sporting events established in 1998
1998 establishments in Hawaii
2000 disestablishments in Hawaii
Recurring sporting events disestablished in 2000